The Edward Dexter House is a historic house in the College Hill neighborhood of Providence, Rhode Island. It is a -story wood-frame structure, built in 1795–1797, with a hip roof topped by a square monitor. Its main facade is five bays wide, with the center bay flanked by two-story pilasters and topped by a small gable pediment. The well-preserved interior provided a template for an early-20th-century museum space designed by the Rhode Island School of Design to house a furniture collection donated by the house's then-owner, Charles Pendleton. The house is one of the few 18th-century houses in the city's College Hill neighborhood. It was originally located at the corner of George and Prospect Streets; in 1860 it was sawed in half and moved in sections to its present location.

The house was listed on the National Register of Historic Places in 1971.

Gallery

See also

 National Register of Historic Places listings in Providence, Rhode Island

References

External links
 

Houses completed in 1795
Houses on the National Register of Historic Places in Rhode Island
Houses in Providence, Rhode Island
Historic American Buildings Survey in Rhode Island
National Register of Historic Places in Providence, Rhode Island
Historic district contributing properties in Rhode Island